Battlefield medicine, also called field surgery and later combat casualty care, is the treatment of wounded combatants and non-combatants in or near an area of combat. Civilian medicine has been greatly advanced by procedures that were first developed to treat the wounds inflicted during combat. With the advent of advanced procedures and medical technology, even polytrauma can be survivable in modern wars. Battlefield medicine is a category of military medicine.

Chronology of battlefield medical advances 

 During Alexander the Great’s military campaigns in the fourth century BC, tourniquets were used to stanch the bleeding of wounded soldiers. Romans used them to control bleeding, especially during amputations. These tourniquets were narrow straps made of bronze, using leather only for comfort.
 An early stretcher, likely made of wicker over a frame, appears in a manuscript from c.1380. Simple stretchers were common with militaries right through the middle of the 20th century.
 During the Battle of Shrewsbury in 1403, Prince Henry had an arrow removed from his face using a specially designed surgical instrument.
 Ambulances or dedicated vehicles for the purpose of carrying injured persons were first used by Spanish soldiers during the Siege of Málaga (1487).
 French military surgeon Ambroise Paré (1510–90) pioneered modern battlefield wound treatment. His two main contributions to battlefield medicine are the use of dressing to treat wounds and the use of ligature to stop bleeding during amputation.
 The practice of triage, pioneered by Dominique Jean Larrey during the Napoleonic Wars (1803–1815). He also pioneered the use of ambulances in the midst of combat ('ambulances volantes', or flying ambulances). Prior to this, military ambulances had waited for combat to cease before collecting the wounded by which time many casualties would have succumbed to their injuries.
 Russian surgeon Nikolay Ivanovich Pirogov was one of the first surgeons to use ether as an anaesthetic in 1847, as well as the very first surgeon to use anaesthesia in a field operation during the Crimean War.
 American Civil War surgeon Jonathan Letterman (1824–72) originated modern methods of medical organization within armies.
 The Relief Society for Wounded Soldiers, forerunner of the International Committee of the Red Cross (ICRC) was founded in 1863 in Geneva. The ICRC advocated for the establishment of national aid societies for battlefield medical relief, and stood behind the First Geneva Convention of 1864 which provided neutrality for medics, ambulances, and hospitals. 
 In the late 19th century, the influence of notable medical practitioners like Friedrich von Esmarch and members of the Venerable Order of Saint John pushing for every adult man and woman to be taught the basics of first aid eventually led to institutionalised first-aid courses amongst the military and standard first-aid kits for every soldier.
 Advances in surgery - especially amputation - during the Napoleonic Wars and First World War on the battlefield of the Somme.
 Medical advances also provided kinder methods for treatment of battlefield injuries, such as antiseptic ointments, which replaced boiling oil for cauterizing amputations.
 During the Spanish Civil War there were two major advances. The first one was the invention of a practical method for transporting blood. Developed in Barcelona by Duran i Jordà, the technique mixed the blood of the donors with the same blood type and then, using Grífols glass tubes and a refrigerator truck, transported the blood to the frontline. A few weeks later Norman Bethune developed a similar service. The second advance was the invention of the mobile operating room by the Catalan Moisès Broggi, who worked for the International Brigades.

 The establishment of fully equipped and mobile field hospitals such as the Mobile Army Surgical Hospital was first practiced by the United States in World War II. It was succeeded in 2006 by the Combat Support Hospital.
 The use of helicopters as ambulances, or MEDEVACs, was first practiced in Burma in 1944. The first MEDEVAC under fire was done in Manila in 1945 where over 70 troops were extracted in five helicopters, one and two at a time.
 The extension of emergency medicine to pre-hospital settings through the use of emergency medical technicians.
 The use of remote physiological monitoring devices on soldiers to show vital signs and biomechanical data to the medic and MEDEVAC crew before and during trauma. This allows medicine and treatment to be administered as soon as possible in the field and during extraction. Similar telemetry units are used in crewed spaceflight, where a flight surgeon at the Command Center can monitor vital signs. This can help to see issues before larger problems occur, such as elevated carbon dioxide levels, or a rise in body temperature indicating a possible infection.

History of Tactical Combat Casualty Care (TCCC) 
In 1989, the Commander of the Naval Special Warfare Command (NAVSPECWARCOM) established a research program to conduct studies on medical and physiologic issues. The research concluded that extremity hemorrhage was a leading cause of preventable death in the battlefield. At that time, proper care and treatment was not provided immediately which often resulted in death. This insight prompted a systematic reevaluation of all aspects of battlefield trauma care that was conducted from 1993 to 1996 as a joint effort by special operations medical personnel and the Uniformed Services University of the Health Sciences. Through this 3-year research, the first version of the TCCC guidelines were created to train soldiers to provide effective intervention on the battlefield. The TCCC aims to combine good medicine with good small-unit tactics. One very important aspect that the TCCC outlined was the use of tourniquets, initially there was a belief that the use of tourniquets led to the preventable loss of an extremity due to ischemia but after careful literature search the committee arrived at the conclusion that there was not enough information out there to confirm this claim. The TCCC therefore outline the appropriate usage of tourniquets to provide effective first aid on the battlefield.

After the TCCC article was published in 1996, the program undertook 4 parallel efforts during the next 5-year period. These efforts are as follows: 

 Presenting TCCC concepts to senior Department of Defense (DoD) line and medical leaders and advocating for their use.
 Identifying and developing responses to representative types of TCCC casualty scenarios.
 Initiating TCCC’s first strategic partnership with civilian trauma organizations—the Prehospital Trauma Life Support (PHTLS) Committee, the National Association of Emergency Medical Technicians (NAEMT), and the American College of Surgeons Committee on Trauma (ACS-COT).
 Expanding TCCC training beyond medical personnel to include SEAL and 75th Ranger Regiment combat leaders and nonmedical unit members.

Current applications of battlefield medicine 

Over the past decade combat medicine has improved drastically.  Everything has been given a complete overhaul from the training to the gear.  In 2011, all enlisted military medical training for the U.S. Navy, Air Force, and Army were located under one command, the Medical Education and Training Campus (METC).  After attending a basic medical course there (which is similar to a civilian EMT course), the students go on to advanced training in Tactical Combat Casualty Care.

Tactical combat casualty care (TCCC) 

Tactical combat casualty care is becoming the standard of care for the tactical management of combat casualties within the Department of Defense and is the sole standard of care endorsed by both the American College of Surgeons and the National Association of EMT's for casualty management in tactical environments.

Tactical combat casualty care is built around three definitive phases of casualty care:
 Care Under Fire: Care rendered at the scene of the injury while both the medic and the casualty are under hostile fire. Available medical equipment is limited to that carried by each operator and the medic. This stage focuses on a quick assessment, and placing a tourniquet on any major bleed.
 Tactical Field Care: Rendered once the casualty is no longer under hostile fire. Medical equipment is still limited to that carried into the field by mission personnel. Time prior to evacuation may range from a few minutes to many hours.  Care here may include advanced airway treatment, IV therapy, etc. The treatment rendered varies depending on the skill level of the provider as well as the supplies available.  This is when a corpsman/medic will make a triage and evacuation decision.
 Tactical Evacuation Care (TACEVAC): Rendered while the casualty is evacuated to a higher echelon of care. Any additional personnel and medical equipment pre-staged in these assets will be available during this phase.

Since "90% of combat deaths occur on the battlefield before the casualty ever reaches a medical treatment facility" (Col. Ron Bellamy) TCCC focuses training on major hemorrhaging and airway complications such as a tension-pneumothorax.  This has driven the casualty fatality rate down to less than 9%.

Interventions used 
Listed below are interventions that a TCCC provider may be expected to perform depending on the phase of TCCC they are at and their level of training. This list is not comprehensive and may be subject to change with future revisions in TCCC guidelines.

Hemorrhage control interventions include the use of extremity tourniquets, junctional tourniquets, trauma dressings, wound packing with compressed gauze and hemostatic dressings, and direct pressure. Newer devices approved for use by the CoTCCC for hemorrhage control include the iTClamp and XStat. Pharmacological options also include tranexamic acid, and hemostatic agents such as zeolite and chitosan.

In managing a casualty’s airway, a TCCC provider may position the casualty in the recovery position or utilize airway adjuncts such as nasopharyngeal airways, oropharyngeal airways, and supraglottic airways. They may also utilize the jaw thrust and head-tilt/ chin-lift maneuver to open a casualty's airway. Advanced TCCC providers may also perform endotracheal intubation and cricothyroidotomy.

Respiratory management largely revolves around the use of chest seals, vented and unvented, and needle decompressions to manage tension pneumothoraxes.

In circulation management a TCCC provider may obtain intravenous/ intraosseous access for the administration of fluids such as normal saline, lactated Ringer’s solution, whole blood, and colloids and plasma substitutes for fluid resuscitation. This also provides a route for the administration of other drugs in accordance with the provider’s scope of practice.

Head injuries would indicate for cervical spine immobilization to the best of the provider’s abilities if deemed appropriate in a given setting, or the use of devices such as a cervical collar.

As trauma-induced hypothermia is a leading cause of battlefield deaths, a provider may also perform hypothermia prevention can be accomplished through the use of a Hypothermia Prevention and Management Kit or emergency blanket, the placement of a casualty on an insulated surface, and the removal of wet clothing from a casualty’s body.

Care under fire 
Care under fire is care provided at the point of injury immediately upon wounding while the casualty and care provider remain under effective hostile fire. The casualty should be encouraged to provide self-aid and continue remain engaged in the firefight if possible. If unable to do so, the casualty should be encouraged to move behind cover or "play dead". Due to the high risk of injury to the care-provider and limited resources at this phase, care provided to the casualty should be limited to controlling life-threatening hemorrhage with tourniquets and preventing airway obstruction by placing casualty in the recovery position. The primary focus during care under fire should be winning the firefight to prevent further casualties and further wounding of existing casualties.

Tactical field care 
Tactical field care phase begins when the casualty and care-provider are no longer under imminent threat of injury by hostile actions. Though the level of danger is lessened, care-providers should exercise caution and maintain good situational awareness as the tactical situation may be fluid and subject to change. The tactical field care phase enables the provision of more comprehensive care according to care providers' levels of training, tactical considerations, and available resources. Major tasks that are to be completed in the tactical field care phase include the rapid trauma survey, the triage of all casualties, and the transport decision.

Tactical evacuation care 
Tactical evacuation care refers to care provided when a casualty is being evacuated and en-route to higher levels of medical care. Care providers at this phase are at even less risk of imminent harm as result of hostile actions.  Due to improved access to resources and the tactical situation, more advanced interventions can be provided to casualties such as endotracheal intubation. Patient re-assessments and the addressing of issues that were not or were inadequately addressed previously are also major components of this phase.

In tactical evacuation (TACEVAC), casualties are moved from a hostile environment to a safer and more secure location to receive advanced medical care. Tactical evacuation techniques use a combination of air, ground and water units to conduct the mission depending on the  location of the incident and medical centres. Ground vehicle evacuations are more prevalent in urban locations that are in close proximity to medical facilities. Requests for evacuation of casualties and pertinent information are typically communicated through 9-Line MEDEVAC and MIST reports.

Tactical evaluation is an umbrella term that encompasses both medical evacuation (MEDEVAC) and casualty evacuation (CASEVAC). Medical evacuation platforms are typically not engaged in combat except in self-defence and defence of patients. MEDEVAC takes place using special dedicated medical assets marked with a red cross. Casualty evacuation is through non-medical platforms and may include a Quick-Reaction force aided by air support.

For aircraft involved TACEVAC situations there are many considerations that need to be accounted for. Firstly, the flying rules vary widely depending on the aircraft and units in play. The list of determinants to create the TACEVAC strategy include the distances and altitudes involved, time of day, passenger capacity, hostile threat, availability of medical equipment/personnel, and icing conditions. As mentioned TACEVAC is more advanced than TCCC, it also includes training to/for: 

 improve breathing 
 provide supplemental oxygen 
 administer Tranexamic acid (TXA) 
 deal with traumatic brain injuries 
 fluid resuscitation
 blood product administration
 blood transfusion
 preventing and treating hypothermia

Canadian armed forces 
There are three levels of tactical combat casualty care providers in the Canadian Armed Forces.

Combat first aid 
Every soldier receives a two-day combat first aid training course. The course focuses on treating hemorrhages, using tourniquets and applying dressings, and basic training for casualty management.

Tactical combat casualty care 
A select number of soldiers are chosen to participate in an intense 2-week tactical combat casualty care course where soldiers are provided with additional training. Overall, they are trained to work as medic extenders since they work under the direction of medics.

Tactical medicine 
The tactical medicine (TACMED) course is offered exclusively to medics. The tactical medicine program provides training for advanced tactical combat casualty care and is the highest level of care provided by the Canadian Armed Forces in a battlefield setting. Medics are trained to treat and manage patients using the MARCHE protocol. The MARCHE protocol prioritizes potential preventable causes of death in warfare as follows:

 Massive hemorrhage control
 Airway management
 Respiratory management
 Circulation
 Bleeding control
 Intravenous (IV)/ intraosseous (IO) access
 Fluid resuscitation
 Tourniquet reassessment
 Hypothermia prevention
 Head injuries
 Eye injuries
 Everything else
 Monitor patient
 Pain management
 Head-to-toe assessment
 Address all wounds found
 Antibiotics
 Tactical evacuation preparation
 Documentation of care and findings

United States

Care under fire 
Care under fire happens at the point of injury. According to tactical combat casualty care guidelines, the most effective way to reduce further morbidity and mortality is to return fire at enemy combatants by all personnel. The priority is to continue the combat mission, gain fire superiority, and then treat casualties. The only medical treatment rendered in care under fire is the application of direct pressure on massive bleeding. Tactical combat casualty care recommends a tourniquet as the single most important treatment at the point of injury. It is recommended during care under fire to quickly place tourniquets over clothing, high, and tight; the tourniquet should be reassessed when out of danger in the tactical field care phase.

Tactical field care 
Tactical field care is considered to be the backbone of Tactical Combat Casualty Care and consists of care rendered by first responders or prehospital medical personnel while still in the tactical environment. The acronyms MARCH and PAWS help personnel remember crucial treatment steps while under duress.

MARCH 
The MARCH acronym is used by personnel to remember the proper order of treatment for casualties.

Massive hemorrhage. The most potentially survivable cause of death is hemorrhage from extremity bleeds, however more than 90% of 4596 combat mortalities post September 11, 2001 died of hemorrhage associated injuries. It is recommended to apply a Committee on Tactical Combat Casualty Care (CoTCCC) approved tourniquet for any life-threatening extremity hemorrhages. Tourniquets during tactical field care should be placed under clothing 2 to 3 inches above the wound, with application time written on the tourniquet.

Airway. Non-patent or closed airway is another survivable cause of death. Airway injuries typically occur due to inhalation burns or maxillofacial trauma. If a person is conscious and speaking they have a patent open airway, while nasopharyngeal airway could benefit those who are unconscious and breathing. However, unconscious casualties who are not breathing could require surgical cricothyroidotomy, as endotracheal intubation is highly difficult in tactical settings.

Respirations. Tension pneumothorax (PTX) develops when air trapped in the chest cavity displaces functional lung tissue and puts pressure on the heart causing cardiac arrest. Thus, open chest wounds must be sealed using a vented chest seal. Tension pneumothorax should be decompressed using a needle chest decompression (NCD) with a 14 gauge, 3.25 inch needle with a catheter. Ventilation and/or oxygenation should be supported as required.

Circulation. It is more important to stem the flow of bleeding than to infuse fluids, and only casualties in shock or those who need intravenous (IV) medications should have IV access. Signs of shock include unconsciousness or altered mental status, and/or abnormal radial pulse. IV should be applied using an 18 gauge catheter and saline lock in tactical field care, secured by transparent would-dressing film. Tranexamic acid (TXA) should be given as soon as possible to casualties in or at risk of hemorrhagic shock. An intraosseous (IO) device could also be used for administering fluids if IV access is not feasible.

Head injury/hypothermia. Secondary brain injury is worsened by hypotension (systolic blood pressure under 90 mmHg), hypoxia (peripheral capillary oxygen saturation under 90%), and hypothermia (whole body temperature below 95 Fahrenheit or 35 Celsius). Medical personnel can use the Military Acute Concussion Evaluation (MACE), while non-medical personnel can use the alert, verbal, pain, unresponsive (AVPU) scale to identify traumatic brain injury. The "lethal triad" is a combination of hypothermia, acidosis, and coagulopathy in trauma patients. Since hypothermia can occur regardless of ambient temperature due to blood loss, the Hypothermia Prevention and Management Kit (HPMK) is recommended for all casualties.

PAWS 
The PAWS acronym is used by personnel to remember additional casualty care items that should be addressed.

Pain. Proper management of pain reduces stress on a casualty's mind and body, and have reduced incidents of post-traumatic stress disorder (PTSD). Pain management is shown to reduce harmful patient movement, improves compliance and cooperation, and allows for easier transport as well as improved health outcomes.

Antibiotics. All battlefield wounds are considered contaminated, and thus any penetrating injury should receive antibiotics at the point of injury as well as in tactical field care. The recommended parenteral antibiotics are 1g ertapenem or 2g cefotetan, which can treat multi drug-resistant bacteria. if the casualty can tolerate oral fluids, 400mg moxifloxacin can be administered orally instead of ertapenem or cefotetan.

Wounds. Assessing the casualty for additional wounds improves morbidity and mortality. First responders must address burns, open fractures, facial trauma, amputation dressings, and security of tourniquets. Prior to movement, reassessment of wounds and interventions is very important. Casualties with penetrating trauma to the chest or abdomen should receive priority evacuation due to the possibility of internal hemorrhage.

Splinting. Explosions (such as from improvised explosive device or land mines) that cause lower extremity traumatic amputation cause forces to move upward through the body, which may cause further bone disruption, hollow organ collapse, or internal bleeding. Thus, first responders should use the Combat Ready Clamp (CRoC), the Junctional Emergency Treatment Tool (JETT), or the SAM Junctional Tourniquet to control junctional hemorrhage and stabilize the pelvis. In cases of penetrative eye trauma, responders should first perform a rapid field test of visual acuity, then tape a rigid shield over the eye to prevent further damage, and also give 400mg oral moxifloxacin as soon as possible. Pressure must never by applied to an eye suspected of penetrative injury.

Evaluating effectiveness 
In order to evaluate the effectiveness of Tactical Combat Casualty Care, a study was conducted which analyzed US military casualties who died from an injury that occurred while they were deployed to Afghanistan or Iraq from October 2001 to June 2011. Of the 4,596 casualties, 87% died in the pre-medical treatment facility, prior to receiving surgical care. Of the casualties in the pre-medical treatment facility, 75.7% of the prehospital deaths were non-survivable, while 24.3% of deaths were potentially survivable. Instantaneous non-survivable mortalities included physical dismemberment, catastrophic brain injury, and destructive cardiovascular injury. Non-instantaneous non-survivable mortalities included severe traumatic brain injury, thoracic vascular injury, high spinal cord injury, and destructive abdominal pelvic injury. These injuries are very difficult to treat given currently fielded medical therapies such as Tactical Combat Casualty Care.

In terms of potentially survivable mortalities, 8.0% of mortalities were associated with airway obstruction. Majority of mortalities (90.9%) which were classified as potentially survivable mortalities were attributed to hemorrhage, with 67.3% of the hemorrhage being truncal, 19.2% junctional, and 13.5% extremity. During the study period, there were no effective protocols put in place to control junctional or truncal sources of hemorrhage in the battlefield, which suggests a gap in medical treatment capability.

This study shows the majority of battlefield casualties which occur prior to receiving surgical care are non-survivable. However, of the casualties which are survivable, the majority of deaths can be attributed to hemorrhages. Developing protocol which can control and temporize hemorrhage in the battlefield would improve the effectiveness of Tactical Combat Casualty Care, and decreases the number of casualties in the battlefield.

Another study analyzed the effectiveness of tourniquets for hemorrhage control, which are used in Tactical Combat Casualty Care. A four-year retrospective analysis showed that out of 91 soldiers who were treated with tourniquets, 78% of tourniquets were applied effectively. The success rate for tourniquets applied to upper limbs was 94% while the success rate for tourniquets applied to lower limbs was 71%. The difference between the success rates can be attributed to the tourniquets themselves, as in another study, tourniquets applied on healthy volunteers resulted in a much lower success rate for lower limbs in comparison to upper limbs. Therefore, the tourniquets themselves can be redesigned to increase its effectiveness and improve Tactical Combat Casualty Care.

A prospective study of all trauma patients treated at the Canadian-led Role 3 multinational medical unit (Role 3 MMU) established at Kandahar Airfield Base between February 7, 2006, to May 20, 2006, was conducted to examine how Tactical Combat Casualty Care interventions are delivered. The study concluded that tourniquets are effective, but must be used appropriately. The distinction between venous and arterial tourniquets must be reinforced in Tactical Combat Casualty Care training. Tactical Combat Casualty Care courses must also train soldiers to remove tourniquets for the purposes of reassessing trauma after the patient and caregiver is no longer under enemy fire. This is because the risks of iatrogenic ischemic injury of prolonged use of tourniquets outweigh the risks of increased blood loss.

The study also identified technical errors in performing needle decompressions. All needle decompressions were performed at least 2 cm medial to the mid-clavicular line and well within the cardiac box. This may result in injury to the heart and surrounding vasculature. Tactical Combat Casualty Care training must reinforce using landmarks when performing needle decompressions. This is especially useful since soldiers may have to perform this procedure in poor lighting conditions.

See also 
 Military Medicine
 Medical Corps
 Combat medic
 Aid station
 History of medicine
 Timeline of medicine and medical technology
 Textbook of Military Medicine
 Medical Education and Training Campus
 CASEVAC
 National Association of Emergency Medical Technicians

Citations

Further reading

Memoirs

External links 
 
 
 

Military medicine
+